Kemmel was a battle honour awarded to units of the British and Imperial Armies that took part in one or more of the following engagements in the World War I.
First Battle of the Kemmelberg, 17–19 Apr 1918
Second Battle of the Kemmelberg, 25–26 Apr 1918

References

Battle honours of the British Army